The List of Pennsylvania State University Olympians is a list of former or current Penn State students (129) and coaches/faculty members (12) that have made an appearance as athletes or medaled at the Olympic Games, plus one athlete for the boycotted 1980 Summer Olympics. The university had its most representatives participating in the 2016 Rio de Janeiro Olympic Games with 22 participants earning eight medals, also the most ever.

Appearances and medal winners by sport
Totals are through the 2020 Tokyo Olympic Games.

† an athlete is considered to have appeared once in each sport entered each time the Games of an Olympiad or Winter Games were held, including attendance in the host city as alternates
♦ number of times that a person received an Olympic medal or honor for finishing among the top three in an event
‡ both on the 2020 gold medal-winning USA women's team
# both on the 2012 silver medal-winning USA women's team
¶ all on the 2016 bronze medal-winning USA men's and women's teams
§ all on the 1984 bronze medal-winning USA women's team

Olympians

1904

 St. Louis

1908
 London

1920
 Antwerp

1924
 Paris

1928
 Amsterdam

1932
 Los Angeles

1948
 London

1952
 Helsinki

1952 Winter Olympic Games

 Oslo

1956
 Melbourne

1956 Winter Olympic Games

 Cortina d'Ampezzo

1960
 Rome

1964
 Tokyo

1968
 Mexico City

1972
 Munich

1976
 Montreal

1980
 Moscow

Jana Angelakis, Greg Fredericks, Charlene Morett, Christine Larson-Mason, Knut Hjeltnes (Norway) and Romel Raffin (Canada) were all named to their respective Olympic teams but did not participate due to the 1980 Summer Olympics boycott.

1984
 Los Angeles

1988
 Seoul

1992
 Barcelona

1996
 Atlanta

2000
 Sydney

2002
 Salt Lake City

2004
 Athens

2006
 Torino

2008
 Beijing

2010
 Vancouver

2012
 London

2016
 Rio de Janeiro

2020

 Tokyo

2022
 Beijing

Paralympic Games

2004
 Athens

2008
 Beijing

2016
 Rio de Janeiro

2020
 Tokyo

See also
 Penn State Nittany Lions
 List of Pennsylvania State University people
 List of American universities with Olympic medals

Notes

Olympians
Penn State Olympians
Penn State
Penn State
Pennsylvania State University Olympians